Mr Kipling is a brand of cakes, pies and baked goods made in Carlton, South Yorkshire and Stoke-on-Trent, and marketed in the United Kingdom, Ireland, Australia and North America. It was introduced in May 1967 (at a time when cakes were more often bought from local bakers), to sell cakes of a local baker's standard to supermarkets, and grew to become the United Kingdom's largest cake manufacturer by 1976. The trademark is owned by Premier Foods, after its acquisition of Joseph Marassery (RHM) in 2007.

Mr Kipling's Cakes were made by the RHM subsidiary known as Manor Bakeries Ltd. which also produced products under the Lyons and Cadbury names. The Cadbury cakes are produced under licence from Cadbury plc, the owners of the brand name.

Branding
The brand was created in the 1960s by Rank Hovis McDougall, which wanted to boost cake sales and utilise a new bakery. The brand was  launched in 1967 and included 20 products sold in premium boxes. The name, Mr. Kipling, was invented for marketing purposes.

With advertising using the phrase "exceedingly good cakes", and television adverts which originally featured the voice of actor James Hayter, the brand had become the market leader in the United Kingdom by 1976, a position it still holds over forty years later. Varieties of single-serving and individually wrapped cakes have also been marketed.

In the early 2000s, the Mr Kipling brand moved away from its familiar design, and, for about a year, a modern logo, consisting of a red oval with "Mr Kipling" in a script font inside the oval, was used. The slogan was modified to simply read "Exceedingly Good" and the description of cakes on the back of the packaging was altered so that it no longer appeared as if it were written by Mr Kipling.

Around 2005, the manufacturers briefly experimented with another new logo and a striking pack design: pack-fronts simply consisting of the words "Mr Kipling", the name of the cake, and the phrase "Exceedingly good cakes" in a more formal, classic typeface; the only image of the cake on each pack-front was a close-up of one part of it, used as a background image for the entire pack. Around the same time, the write-ups on the back of their packaging once again purported to be written by the person of Mr Kipling. Shortly afterwards, however, the pack design and brand image wholeheartedly returned to its roots. The logo introduced at the time was very closely based on the original one, featuring a traditional-style font in a gold-edged shape, the packs feature images of the cake(s), and various product features and write-ups are featured on the pack-front. In 2009, the pack designs were slightly revamped, with more emphasis put on the name of each product; the write-ups on the back of the pack no longer purport to be written by Mr Kipling.

Premier Foods also introduced what it termed 'Snap Pack' packaging (now renamed 'Snack Pack'), providing cakes in individually sealed plastic packs to keep them fresh. It quickly became a top-seller for the brand.

In 2018, the brand redesigned their packaging for the North American and Australian markets. The new design aimed for a more contemporary and distinctive look to attract new customers, steering away from Mr. Kipling's heritage. However, Mr. Kipling's wordmark logo remained the same. Furthermore, the brand's UK slogan "exceedingly good cakes" was replaced with "make every day delicious" for the international market.

Products 
Mr. Kipling's signature product range includes:

Slices 

 Almond slices
 Carrot cake slices
 Angel slices
 Lemon layered slices
 Bakewell slices
 Chocolate slices
 Country slices
 Unicorn slices
 Trifle tarts (since 1990)

Pies and Tarts 

 Bramley apple & blackcurrant pies
 Bramley apple pies
 Mini fruit pie selection
 Cherry bakewells
 Mini bakewells selection
 Jam tarts
 Mini sponge tart selection

Goodies 

 French fancies
 Lemon fancies

Biscuits 

 Viennese whirls

Cakes 

 Manor house cake
 Battenberg 
 Mini battenbergs

French Fancies 
Mr Kipling French Fancies are small sponge cakes, topped with a hemisphere of vegetable-oil "buttercream". The cakes are coated with fondant icing, with several varieties drizzled with a second colour. Standard varieties are pink ("vanilla") with white drizzle, yellow ("lemon") with brown drizzle, and brown (chocolate) with dark brown drizzle.  

Whereas cocoa is cited in the ingredients list, strawberry and lemon are not.  The cakes are 30% sugar.

French Fancies were among the 20 varieties of cake that were part of the initial Mr Kipling launch in 1967.

In September 2008, Mr Kipling announced the Big French Fancy, a large cake which can be sliced into portions. A limited edition appeared in 2012, renamed British Fancies, containing cakes in red, white and blue. Supermarket and home-made copies are called Fondant Fancies.

References

External links

Premier Foods website

Bakeries of the United Kingdom
Food brands of the United Kingdom
British pie brands
Food and drink companies established in 1967
English cuisine
Food manufacturers of the United Kingdom
Premier Foods brands
1967 establishments in England